The Dutch House is a historic house, lying on Ogleforth, in the city centre of York, in England.

The house was built in brick in about 1650, with Andrew Graham dating it to 1648.  It is a small building and originally had two rooms on the ground floor and one on the first floor.  Later in the 17th-century, two Dutch gables were added to the front, each with a dormer window.  Originally, it is believed to have had only an external staircase, suggesting that it was not a domestic building.

In the 18th century, the building's interior was heavily altered, and by the early 19th century, it had been divided into three tenements.  In 1954, it was Grade II* listed but it was in a poor state of repair, and in 1956, John Smith's Brewery announced plans to demolish it.  Instead, the York Civic Trust restored the building, with much of the front wall entirely rebuilt, as a copy of the original.  It then formed part of the brewery, but in 2010 was converted to accommodation, and has since been available to let for holidays.  This more recent work won a York Design Award.

The building is of two storeys and an attic.  It is four bays wide, with the leftmost bay having no windows or doors.  The other three all differ: a window with three lights on each floor in the second bay, a round-headed door with an oriel window above in the third bay, and a smaller first floor window in the fourth bay, with the ground floor window having been filled in, though its pediment remains.

References

External links

Buildings and structures completed in 1648
Grade II* listed buildings in York
Brick buildings and structures